The EuroHockey Youth Championship is an international boys' and girls' under–18 field hockey competition organised by the European Hockey Federation (EHF). It is held biannually and is the top level Youth Championship for the under–18 age group.

Spain boys' and the Netherlands girls' teams are the current champions.

Boys' tournament

Results

Summary

* = hosts

Team appearances

Girls' tournament

Results

Summary

* = hosts

Team appearances

See also
EuroHockey Junior Championship

References

External links
Official website
All results

 
Youth
2002 establishments in Europe
Hockey
Recurring sporting events established in 2002